Marya Cohn is an American screenwriter and director.

Biography
In 1994, Cohn directed the student short film Developing. The film starred a then unknown Natalie Portman in her first film role.

In 2013, Cohn began filming her feature film debut, The Girl in the Book starring Emily Vancamp in a semi-autobiographical film about a young book editor who is forced to work with a man who abused her as a teenager. Post-production for the film was completed via kickstarter The film premiered at the 2015 Los Angeles Film Festival. It was acquired by Myriad Pictures and given a limited release in December 2015.

Cohn is the daughter of talent agent Sam Cohn. She is of Jewish descent.

In 1994, she married director Fraser Bresnahan.

In 2001, she married Dutch director Tjebbo Penning.

Filmography
Developing (1994)
The Girl in the Book  (2015)

References

External links

American film directors
American women screenwriters
American women film directors
Living people
Year of birth missing (living people)